Lamar Gant (born 1957 in Fort Collins, Colorado) is an American world record-holding powerlifter. He competed with idiopathic scoliosis. He was inducted into the International Powerlifting Federation Hall of Fame in 1980.

He holds the world records for deadlifting in both the 123- and 132-pound weight classes. His best lifts at 123 pounds are  RAW bench press and  deadlift; at 132 pounds are  squat  (in training),  RAW bench press, and  deadlift.

References

American powerlifters
1957 births
Living people